Weston-under-Lizard is a village and former civil parish, now in the parish of Blymhill and Weston-under-Lizard, in the South Staffordshire district of Staffordshire, England. It is known as Weston-under-Lizard (the name of a hill in nearby Shropshire) to distinguish it from Weston-on-Trent. It should not be confused with the village of Weston, to the north east of Stafford. In 1961 the parish had a population of 294. On 1 April 1986 the parish was abolished and merged with Blymhill to form "Blymhill and Weston-under-Lizard".

The village is on the A5 (here following the course of Watling Street), and is very close to the county boundary with Shropshire. Nearby places are Blymhill, within Staffordshire, and Tong in Shropshire. To the south of the village is Weston Park the ancestral home of the Earls of Bradford and the venue for the V Festival. Associated with the Hall, there is the parish church of St. Andrew, where Honora Sneyd was buried.

A variation in the spelling of the village name may be seen in an old Law record.

Church of St Andrew
The Church of St Andrew is a Grade I listed Anglican church. Its origins are medieval, but it was largely rebuilt in the very early 18th century by Elizabeth Wilbraham of Weston Park, and restored in the 19th century, firstly by George Edmund Street and then by Ewan Christian. It remains an active parish church in the Diocese of Lichfield.

See also
Listed buildings in Blymhill and Weston-under-Lizard

Bibliography

References

External links

Villages in Staffordshire
Former civil parishes in Staffordshire
South Staffordshire District